Friends Keep Secrets (stylized in all caps) is the debut studio album by American record producer Benny Blanco, released on December 7, 2018. It shares its name with Blanco's imprint of Interscope Records, which it was released through. It was preceded by four singles: "Eastside" (with Halsey and Khalid), "I Found You" (with Calvin Harris), "Better to Lie" (with Jesse and Swae Lee), and "Roses" (with Juice Wrld featuring Brendon Urie). A reissue of the album was released on March 26, 2021.

Promotion
On December 6, 2018, Blanco announced on his Instagram story that he was "releasing an album Friday", later posting that he was "still working on the track list" as he had just finished. He also announced his intention to host a "really small BBQ for fans in the LA area" to play his album.

Track listing

Note
  indicates an additional producer.
 Disc two of the reissue contains the tracks listed on the original release.

Personnel
Credits adapted from Tidal.

Musicians

 Benny Blanco – keyboards , programming , guitar 
 Happy Perez – guitar , keyboards , programming 
 Andrew Watt – guitar, programming 
 Cashmere Cat – keyboards, programming 
 Khalid – vocals 
 Halsey – vocals 
 Brendan Urie – vocals 
 Juice Wrld – vocals 
 Francis and the Lights – vocals 
 Justin Vernon – vocals 
 Calvin Harris – vocals 
 John Ryan – background vocals 
 Ammar Malik – guitar 
 Jesse – vocals , additional vocals 
 Swae Lee – vocals 
 Ryan Beatty – additional vocals , vocals 
 Romy – guitar 
 6lack – vocals 
 Ty Dolla Sign – vocals 
 Sandra Levin – additional vocals 
 Poor Riley – guitar 
 Phil Peterson – strings 
 Victoria Parker – violin 
 

Technical

 Şerban Ghenea – mixer 
 Benny Blanco – mixer , engineer , mix engineer 
 Calvin Harris – mixer, engineer 
 David Schwerkolt – engineer 
 Chris Sclafani – engineer 
 Denis Kosiak – engineer 
 Chris Messina – engineer 
 Justin Vernon – engineer 
 John Ryan – engineer 
 Happy Perez – engineer 
 James Royo – engineer 
 6lack – engineer 
 John Hanes – mix engineer , assistant mixer  
 Louis Bell – vocal editing 
 Alex Layne – assistant recording engineer 
 Jeremy Simoneaux – assistant recording engineer

Charts

Weekly charts

Year-end charts

Certifications

References

2018 debut albums
Albums produced by Benny Blanco
Albums produced by Happy Perez
Albums produced by Cashmere Cat
Albums produced by Two Inch Punch
Benny Blanco albums